Sylvan Beach Union Chapel is a historic interdenominational church building located at Sylvan Beach in Oneida County, New York.  It opened on July 3, 1887, and worship services have been held there every summer since then.  The film The Sterile Cuckoo starring Liza Minnelli was shot in part at the church.

It was listed on the National Register of Historic Places in 2009.

References

Churches on the National Register of Historic Places in New York (state)
Churches completed in 1887
19th-century churches in the United States
Churches in Oneida County, New York
National Register of Historic Places in Oneida County, New York